Oskar Wilhelm Bye (3 June 1870 – 30 April 1939) was a Norwegian gymnast who competed in the 1906 Summer Olympics and in the 1908 Summer Olympics.

At the 1906 Summer Olympics in Athens, he was a member of the Norwegian gymnastics team, which won the gold medal in the team, Swedish system event. Two years later he won the silver medal as part of the Norwegian team in the gymnastics team event.

References

1870 births
1939 deaths
Norwegian male artistic gymnasts
Gymnasts at the 1906 Intercalated Games
Gymnasts at the 1908 Summer Olympics
Olympic gymnasts of Norway
Olympic gold medalists for Norway
Olympic silver medalists for Norway
Olympic medalists in gymnastics
Medalists at the 1908 Summer Olympics
Medalists at the 1906 Intercalated Games
20th-century Norwegian people